The men's 4 x 50 yard freestyle relay was a swimming event held as part of the Swimming at the 1904 Summer Olympics programme. It was the first time any relay event was held at the Olympics.  It was the only time yards were used instead of metres, and the only time the 50 was used as a distance rather than the 100 or 200 metre legs that were common.

4 teams of 4 swimmers each competed.

Results

Final

References

Sources
 

Swimming at the 1904 Summer Olympics